Christopher Ian Micklewood (born 14 March 1987 in Westville, KwaZulu-Natal, South Africa) is a former rugby union player. He also spent 10 years at KwaZulu-Natal club side College Rovers, playing over 200 games, including 18 in the SARU Community Cup between 2013 and 2015.

Micklewood was raised in Durban and educated at Westville Boys' High School, where he was Head of School in 2005 and went on to represent the South African Schools side.

He spent a loan period at Sale Sharks in the latter half of 2007, turning out for their Jets team, but making no appearances for the first team, instead playing for Macclesfield in the 2007–08 National Division Three North where he made five appearances. In 2008, he played for London Scottish in the 2007–08 National Division Three South, making nine appearances.

He then joined French side , where he played for their espoirs (youth) team, but failed to make an appearance for their senior squad. He then signed for Newcastle Falcons at the start of the 2009–10 Guinness Premiership season, but made just one appearance for them in the 2009–10 European Challenge Cup.

He then joined KwaZulu-Natal club side College Rovers, which he represented in the SARU Community Cup in 2013, 2014 and 2015 before retiring from the sport.

References

1987 births
Living people
South African rugby union players
Rugby union fullbacks
Boland Cavaliers players
Newcastle Falcons players
Rugby union players from Durban